Pareh Sar District is a district (bakhsh) in Rezvanshahr County, Gilan Province, Iran. At the 2006 census, its population was 30,033, in 7,616 families.  The District has one city: Pareh Sar. The District has two rural districts (dehestan): Dinachal Rural District and Yeylaqi-ye Ardeh Rural District.

Gallery

References 

Rezvanshahr County
Districts of Gilan Province